The Embassy of Panama in London is the diplomatic mission of Panama in the United Kingdom.

Gallery

References

External links
Official site

Panama
Diplomatic missions of Panama
Panama–United Kingdom relations
Panama